The discography of Eric Benét, an R&B singer, consists of seven studio albums, and twenty-one singles.

Albums

Studio albums

Singles

Other appearances

References

Discographies of American artists
Rhythm and blues discographies